Maria Therese Tviberg (born 7 April 1994) is a Norwegian World Cup alpine ski racer and specializes in the technical events of slalom and giant slalom.  She competed at the 2015 World Championships in Beaver Creek, USA, in the Super-G, Downhill, and Combined. On 28 November 2017, Tviberg was injured during a downhill training run at Lake Louise in Alberta, Canada. was airlifted by helicopter to a hospital, and missed the remainder of the season.

World Cup results

Season standings

Top ten finishes
0 podiums; 11 top tens (7 SL, 3 GS, 1 AC)

World Championship results

Olympic results

References

External links

1994 births
Norwegian female alpine skiers
Living people
Alpine skiers at the 2022 Winter Olympics
Olympic alpine skiers of Norway
Medalists at the 2022 Winter Olympics
Olympic medalists in alpine skiing
Olympic bronze medalists for Norway
Sportspeople from Bergen